is a manga series by Yumiko Igarashi and Fumiko Shiba, serialized between March 1993 and September 1994 in Shogakukan's Ciao magazine. It was later adapted into a 51 episode anime that aired in Japan between September 4, 1993, and August 27, 1994. The story revolves around a young girl named Uiba Shikatani and her newly found pet dinosaur, which is named after the only words that come out of its mouth, Muka Muka.

Characters

Muka Muka is Uiba's newly hatched pet dinosaur.

Uiba Shikatani is the daughter of a pet shop owner.

Volumes
  published in September 1993
  published in March 1994
  published in October 1994

External links
 
 

1993 anime television series debuts
1993 manga
Mainichi Broadcasting System original programming
Dinosaurs in anime and manga
Fantasy anime and manga
Nippon Animation
Shōjo manga